Southern Chile is an informal geographic term for any place south of the capital city, Santiago, or south of Biobío River, the mouth of which is Concepción, about  south of Santiago. Generally cities like Temuco are considered to be located in the south despite being relatively close to the geographical center of Chile. This is mainly because mainland Chile ended in La Frontera until the occupation of Araucanía (1861–1883). Similarly, the Southern Chile wine region is close to the geographic center of the country, encompassing wine-growing areas in the Bío Bío Region and Araucanía Region.

Southern Chile may also refer to the Zona Sur region between Biobío and Chacao Channel, which is often also called the Chilean Lake District. It may also refer to the Zona Austral, also called the Extreme South.

List of major cities in Southern Chile 
Ordered from north to south.

 Temuco
 Valdivia
 La Unión
 Rio Bueno
 Osorno
 Puerto Varas
 Puerto Montt
 Castro
 Punta Arenas

Geography of Chile
Regions of South America by country